Délfor Amaranth Dicásolo, better known as Délfor (April 25, 1920 – September 13, 2013), was an Argentine actor, comedian, screenwriter, and artist. He was known for his radio work and comedic routines. His career spanned 57 years.

Early life
Dicásolo was born on April 25, 1920, in Chivilcoy, Buenos Aires, Argentina. His parents were from Naples, Italy.

Personal life and death
Dicásolo had two children. He lived in Buenos Aires with his family until his death in 2013. He died on September 13, 2013, in his Buenos Aires home from natural causes, aged 93.

References

Other websites
 

1920 births
2013 deaths
Argentine male film actors
Argentine male television actors
Argentine comedians
Argentine screenwriters
Male screenwriters
Argentine male writers
Argentine artists
Male actors from Buenos Aires
20th-century Argentine male actors
21st-century Argentine male actors